The Kongsvinger Line is a railway line between the towns of Lillestrøm and Kongsvinger in Norway and onwards to Charlottenberg in Sweden. The railway was opened on 3 October 1862 and is Norway's second standard gauge line (after the Hoved Line). It was electrified in 1951. The line is owned by Bane NOR.

The line
At Kongsvinger there is a junction, the main line turns south and continues to Charlottenberg in Sweden, while another line, the Solør Line—now closed for passenger traffic—runs northwards to Elverum. The entire stretch between Kongsvinger and Charlottenberg, is 115 km long.

At Sørumsand, an old narrow gauge heritage railway called Tertitten operates during the summer.

Passenger service on the Kongsvinger Line is operated mostly by electric multiple unit commuter trains which run between Oslo and Kongsvinger. Passenger service across the border was once frequent and operated by Linx to Stockholm and Kungspilen to Karlstad. However poor business caused these companies to cease operations after 2004. During 2005 and 2006, passenger service between Oslo and Stockholm still existed, but not on a daily basis.

Passenger service across the border is again frequent. Starting 7 January 2007 the Swedish national rail company SJ reinstated daily traffic on the route, although the train journeys are 90 minutes longer than Linx provided, partly because they stop at several stops in Norway and operate as local trains, allowing commuter tickets. The local traffic authority in Värmland operates trains with a similar traffic pattern between Oslo and Karlstad. They have connection with X 2000 high speed trains between Karlstad and Stockholm. The Swedish trains have between Oslo-Kongsvinger replaced some Norwegian local trains, and the Swedish operators get Norwegian funding, on the condition they operate like local trains in Norway.

Stations
Lillestrøm
Tuen
Nerdum
Fetsund
Svingen
Guttersrud
Sørumsand
Blaker
Rånåsfoss
Auli
Haga
Bodung
Årnes
Seterstøa
Disenå
Skarnes
Sander
Galterud
Kongsvinger
Charlottenberg

References

External links
Norwegian National Rail Administration's list of stations on the Kongsvinger Line (in Norwegian)
Norwegian National Rail Administration's list of stations on the Kongsvinger Line (in English, but lacks station descriptions)

 
Railway lines in Innlandet
Railway lines in Viken
Railway lines opened in 1862
Electric railways in Norway
1862 establishments in Norway